Sylvain Maillard (born 28 April 1974) is a French entrepreneur and politician serving as the member of the National Assembly for the 1st constituency of Paris since 2017. A member of La République En Marche! (LREM), his constituency encompasses the 1st, 2nd, 8th and part of the 9th arrondissement.

In early October 2021, Maillard was named in the Pandora Papers

Early life and career
Maillard grew up in Versailles, Yvelines and went on to study accounting and auditing at ICS Bégué in Paris and obtained in 1998, the specialized master's degree "Entrepreneurs-Pedagogy HEC Entrepreneurs"  from the Grenoble Business School. Participating in the Erasmus programme, he studied political science at the University of Munich. In December 1999, he began his national service in Stuttgart as a cooperant abroad. 

Maillard returned to France in April 2001, creating the company Alantys Technology (a company specializing in the distribution of electronic components) in Argenteuil in the Val d'Oise, then several of its subsidiaries. The company is still active as of 2019.

Political career
A successive member of the Union for French Democracy, the Centrists and the Union of Democrats and Independents, Maillard has been a councilor in the 9th arrondissement of Paris since 2014. After joining La Republique En Marche! he was elected deputy in Paris's 1st constituency during the legislative elections of 2017, one of only four lawmakers elected in the first round.

In parliament, Maillard serves on the Committee on Social Affairs. In addition to his committee assignments, he is a member of the French-German Parliamentary Friendship Group and the French-Israeli Parliamentary Friendship Group. He also chairs a working group on ways to fight antisemitism. In 2018, he joined an informal group of around 50 LREM members in support of strengthening entrepreneurship.

In a ranking published by Le Parisien in early 2021, Maillard was ranked as one of the most active members of the National Assembly between 2017 and 2020.

Political positions
In July 2019, Maillard voted in favor of the French ratification of the European Union’s Comprehensive Economic and Trade Agreement (CETA) with Canada.

On Maillard's initiative, a majority in the National Assembly agreed in December 2019 on a non-legally binding resolution modeled on the definition of antisemitism set by the International Holocaust Remembrance Alliance (IHRA).

Controversy
In 2021, Maillard filed a complaint for defamation against the newspaper Le Monde after it had linked him to a financial structure in the Seychelles as part of the in the Pandora Papers revelations.

See also
 2017 French legislative election

References

1974 births
Living people
People from Saint-Maur-des-Fossés
Deputies of the 15th National Assembly of the French Fifth Republic
Ludwig Maximilian University of Munich alumni
La République En Marche! politicians
Councillors of Paris
People from Versailles
French accountants
French businesspeople
French political scientists
People named in the Pandora Papers
Members of Parliament for Paris
Deputies of the 16th National Assembly of the French Fifth Republic